John Seaton (1862 – September 1910) was a Scottish footballer who played for Dumbarton and Clyde.

Honours
Dumbarton
 Dumbartonshire Cup: Runners Up 1895–96

References

1862 births
Scottish footballers
Dumbarton F.C. players
Clyde F.C. players
1910 deaths
Place of birth missing
Scottish Football League players
Date of birth missing
Date of death missing
Association footballers not categorized by position